Henry Hartz Helf (August 26, 1913 – October 27, 1984) was an American professional baseball player. He played as a catcher in Major League Baseball for the Cleveland Indians in 1938 and 1940 and the St. Louis Browns in 1946. From 1944 to 1945, Helf served in the military during World War II.

On August 20, 1938, as part of a publicity stunt by the Come to Cleveland Committee, Helf, along with Indians' catcher, Frankie Pytlak, caught baseballs dropped from Cleveland's  Terminal Tower by Indians' third baseman Ken Keltner. The  drop broke the 555-foot, 30-year-old record set by Washington Senator catcher Gabby Street at the Washington Monument.

References

External links

1913 births
1984 deaths
Major League Baseball catchers
Cleveland Indians players
St. Louis Browns players
Baseball players from Austin, Texas
Nashville Vols players